Black January, also known as the January Massacre, was a violent crackdown on the civilian population of Baku on 19–20 January 1990, as part of a state of emergency during the dissolution of the Soviet Union. General Secretary of the Soviet Communist Party Mikhail Gorbachev and Defence Minister Dmitry Yazov asserted that military law was necessary to thwart efforts by the Azerbaijani independence movement to overthrow the Soviet Azerbaijani government. According to official estimates of Azerbaijan 147 civilians were killed, 800 people were injured and five people went missing. In a resolution of 22 January 1990, the Supreme Soviet of Azerbaijan SSR declared that the decree of the Presidium of the Supreme Soviet of the USSR of 19 January, used to impose emergency rule in Baku and military deployment, constituted an act of aggression.

This list contains 138 people who became victims of the Bloody January attack, most of whom died on 20 January 1990 during the operation of the Soviet troops in the capital of the Azerbaijan SSR. Most of them were buried in the Alley of Martyrs. Several people are considered missing, killed or buried elsewhere.

Memory 
In 2010, a monument was erected in Baku in the memory of the victims of the tragedy. The names of 147 victims are carved on the granite pedestal of the monument in gold letters.

In the building of the Azerbaijani Embassy in Moscow, there is a memorial plate on which the names of the victims of the 20 January tragedy are engraved.

On 16 January 2015, the "Həyatın və ölümün dərsləri" ("Lessons of Life and Death") event dedicated to the 25th anniversary of the 20 January tragedy was held at the Azerbaijan Museum of Independence in Baku. Within the framework of the event, an exhibition was presented, the exposition of which included the personal belongings of the victims of the tragedy donated to the museum in the same year by their relatives. Among the exhibits were the personal belongings of Azer Alekperov, Ulvi Bunyadzade, Ilham Allahverdiyev, Fariza Allahverdiyeva, Alasgar Gaibov, Larisa Mamedova, Andrey Nishchenko, Aghabek Novruzbeyli.

References

Literature 
 

Azerbaijan history-related lists
Azerbaijan Soviet Socialist Republic people
Death-related lists